Samna was a competitor to WordStar and MultiMate in the DOS market for word processors in the 1980s. Based in large part on the look and feel of the Lanier enterprise word processing system's software, Samna was targeted at businesses who had used the Lanier system but were interested in moving to lower-cost PC-based word processing. Samna was developed and published by Samna Corp., an Atlanta, Georgia, U.S.-based computer software company that was bought by Lotus Software in November 1990 for $65 million USD.

Samna is also the developer of Ami and Ami Professional word processors.

Overview
Samna had many strengths, but was regularly criticized in reviews over speed issues.  Even before GUI environments like Windows, it pioneered treating the empty editing screen as a 'scratchpad', that is, a space that you could cursor into, placing a character or other entry anywhere at will on a printable page.  In WordPerfect and Word, and virtually all other editors of that period, territory beyond the last character entered did not exist. When the Hercules graphics card became popular, Samna Word gained a Print Preview mode that was not editable, but showed font and format treatments.

When Windows was released, Samna introduced Ami, a graphics-based word processor, in 1988, which was the first Windows-based word processor on the market and it supported WYSIWYG - What You See Is What You Get (Microsoft Word for Windows did not debut until early 1989). The Windows 3.0 versions were being shipped when Lotus acquired the company, and Ami Pro was folded into Lotus's product line, first becoming Lotus Ami Pro, and then later evolving into Lotus Word Pro.  The signature extension of Ami Pro files, .sam, is a legacy of Samna.

Feature growth
In the era when even disk space, let alone main memory, wasn't yet measured in Gigabytes, the 1991 expansion for "as many fonts as disk space permits, instead of the 30 maximum allowed in previous product versions" was considered important.

Also, in that era, printer vendors and specific models were supported individually, rather than via Windows-based device-independence. The above announcement also included "increased support for laser printers."

Specific features were by then a matter of checklists for reviewers and marketing material, as per the 1986 Version III.

From Samna to IBM
The DOS versions of Samna competed with WordStar, Wordperfect, DisplayWrite, MultiMate and 
Microsoft's Word (DOS); Wordperfect and Wordstar were the leaders.

With the shift to Windows, the two market leaders were Ami Pro and MS Word for Windows, although Wordperfect still retained its lead in the then-declining DOS market.

Samna, which had been purchased by Lotus Software, was subsequently acquired by IBM, which was also marketing DisplayWrite. Meanwhile "Ami Pro (for Windows) achieved a far greater market share than its previous DOS incarnations."

Although the third generation, IBM Lotus Word Pro is still in use,
Microsoft Word for Windows, which followed and "learned from the highly successful Macintosh version of Word" is now the predominant word processing program.

References

Companies based in Atlanta
Defunct software companies of the United States
Defunct companies based in Georgia (U.S. state)